NFL 2K, sometimes called Sega Sports NFL 2K, is a video game developed by Visual Concepts and published by Sega for the Dreamcast in 1999.

Reception

The game received "universal acclaim" according to the review aggregation website GameRankings. Chris Charla of NextGen called it "A visual masterpiece, and a great football game that will, and should, sell systems." In Japan, where the game was ported for release on January 20, 2000, Famitsu gave it a score of 34 out of 40.

The Rookie of GamePro said in one review, "If you own a Dreamcast and love football, you'd be an absolute fool to pass up this game. Even though you won't find a franchise mode in this year's version, NFL 2K is a deep football sim that'll satisfy any pigskin junkie." Scary Larry said in another review, "who wins the gridiron war? It comes down to this: Madden is the best playing game in town, with incredible depth and superior football skills, but NFL 2K is the way to go if you're undecided, because the graphics, sound, and sheer fun of the game far surpass Madden and GameDay."

The game was a finalist for the "Console Sports Game of the Year", "Outstanding Achievement in Sound Design", "Outstanding Achievement in Visual Engineering", and "Outstanding Achievement in Game Play Engineering" awards at the Academy of Interactive Arts & Sciences' 3rd Annual Interactive Achievement Awards, all of which went to Knockout Kings 2000, Medal of Honor, Unreal Tournament, and The Sims, respectively. The game was also a nominee for CNET Gamecenters 1999 "Dreamcast" award, which went to Soulcalibur.

Notes

References

External links
 

1999 video games
Dreamcast games
Dreamcast-only games
Multiplayer and single-player video games
NFL 2K video games
Sega video games
Video games developed in the United States